Spectrum is an album by saxophonist Illinois Jacquet recorded in 1965 and originally released on the Argo label. The album was one of the last to be released on Argo before Chess Records changed the name to Cadet and subsequently appeared with both labels.

Reception

Allmusic awarded the album 3 stars.

Track listing 
All compositions by Illinois Jacquet except as indicated
 "Goin' Out of My Head" (Teddy Randazzo, Bobby Weinstein) - 2:19  
 "Spanish Boots" - 2:57  
 "Elise" - 2:53  
 "I Remember Her So Well" (Erwin Halletz) - 2:52  
 "Now and Then" (Riz Ortolani) - 2:39  
 "Blues for Bunny" (Russell Jacquet) - 5:11  
 "Black Foot" - 3:50  
 "Big Music" - 5:22  
 "Blue Horizon" - 3:10

Personnel 
Illinois Jacquet - tenor saxophone, alto saxophone
Russell Jacquet (tracks 6-9), James Nottingham (tracks 1-5), Ernie Royal (tracks 1-5) - trumpet
Buddy Lucas - tenor saxophone (tracks 1-5)
Haywood Henry - baritone saxophone (tracks 1-5)
Patricia Bown (track 6-9), Edwin Stoute (track 1-5) - piano
Billy Butler, Eric Gale - guitar (track 1-5)
George Duvivier (track 6-9), Leonard Gaskin (track 1-5) - bass
Herbie Lovelle (tracks 1-5), Grady Tate (tracks 6-9) - drums
Candido - conga (tracks 6-9)
 Bert Keyes - arranger, conductor (tracks 1-5)

References 

1965 albums
Argo Records albums
Cadet Records albums
Illinois Jacquet albums
Albums produced by Esmond Edwards